Air/Cook/Sky is the fourth album by Hitomi Yaida released on 29 October 2003.  The singles from this album were "Kodoku na Cowboy" and "Hitori Jenga". The album title is an anagram of "Yaiko rocks".

Track listing

Notes and references 

2003 albums
Hitomi Yaida albums